Posada may refer to:
Battle of Posada, a 1330 battle, part of the Hungarian-Wallachian Wars

Places

In Poland
Posada, Lower Silesian Voivodeship, south-west Poland
Posada, Łódź Voivodeship, central Poland
Posada, Masovian Voivodeship, east-central Poland
Posada, Gmina Kazimierz Biskupi in Greater Poland Voivodeship, west-central Poland
Posada, Gmina Stare Miasto in Greater Poland Voivodeship, west-central Poland
Posada, Gmina Wierzbinek in Greater Poland Voivodeship, west-central Poland
Posada, Słupca County in Greater Poland Voivodeship, west-central Poland

In other countries
Posada, Sardinia, Italy
Posada, a village administered by Comarnic town, Prahova County, Romania
Posada, Asturias, a parish in Llanes, Asturias, Spain

People with the surname Posada

José Guadalupe Posada (1852–1913), Mexican engraver and illustrator
Luis Posada Carriles (1928–2018), Cuban-born Venezuelan anti-communist militant
José Posada (1940–2013), Spanish member of the European Parliament
Jorge Posada (born 1971), Puerto Rican baseball player, who played for the New York Yankees

See also

La Posada de Albuquerque, a building in Albuquerque, New Mexico
San Giovanni di Posada, Sardinia, Italy
 Posad, a settlement in the Russian Empire, often surrounded by ramparts and a moat, adjoining a town, kremlin or monastery
Posadas (disambiguation)

Spanish-language surnames